The 2020-21 season will be Reggina 1914's 106th season in existence.  After five seasons in the third tier of Italian football, Reggina return to Serie B.  They will also participate in this season's Coppa Italia.

First-team squad

As of 1 February 2021

Transfers and loans

Transfers in

Loans in

Transfers out

Loans out

Pre-season friendlies
Reggina began the first part of pre-season training on July 20 at Centro sportivo Sant'Agata in Reggio Calabria. A squad of 27 players were named for the training camp.

Competitions

Overview

Serie B

League table

Results summary

Results by round

Matches

League fixtures were announced on 9 September 2020.

Coppa Italia

The draw for the tournament was held on 8 September 2020. Reggina will enter in the second round.

Squad statistics

Appearances
Players with no appearances not included in the list.

Goalscorers

Disciplinary record

References

External links

Reggina 1914 seasons
Reggina 1914